Tigist Gezahagn Mengistu (born 12 March 2000) is an Ethiopian Paralympic athlete. She made her maiden Paralympic appearance representing Ethiopia at the 2020 Summer Paralympics. During the 2020 Summer Paralympics, she created history by becoming the first ever gold medalist for Ethiopia in the history of Paralympics.

Career 
She won gold in the women's T13 1500m event at the 2020 Tokyo Paralympics. It was also Ethiopia's first ever gold medal at the Paralympics and her medal achievement was only the third Paralympic medal for Ethiopia with two other medals bring silver.

References

2000 births
Living people
Ethiopian female middle-distance runners
Paralympic athletes of Ethiopia
Paralympic gold medalists for Ethiopia
Paralympic medalists in athletics (track and field)
Athletes (track and field) at the 2020 Summer Paralympics
Medalists at the 2020 Summer Paralympics
21st-century Ethiopian women